Salvia miniata, the Belize sage, is a woody-based herbaceous perennial plant from Belize and the Mexican state of Chiapas. It typically grows on shaded mountain hillsides at  elevation. The single flowers are clear red, with an orange undertone, about 2.5 cm long. The flowers grow in whorls on inflorescences up to 30 cm long.

Notes

miniata
Flora of Mexico
Flora of Belize